The Round Valley Indian Reservation is a federally recognized Indian reservation lying primarily in northern Mendocino County, California, United States. A small part of it extends northward into southern Trinity County. The total land area, including off-reservation trust land, is 93.939 km2 (36.270 sq mi). The total resident population as of the 2000 census was 300 persons, of whom 99 lived in Covelo.

History of the Round Valley Natives 

The Round Valley Indians consists of the Covelo Indian Community. This community is an accumulation of people from several tribes: the Yuki, who were the original inhabitants of Round Valley, Concow Maidu, Little Lake and other Pomo, Nomlaki, Cahto, Wailaki, and Pit River peoples. They were forced onto this remnant of the land formerly occupied by the Yuki tribe.

The Round Valley Indian Reservation began in 1856 as the Nome Cult Farm, an administrative extension of the Nome Lackee Reservation located on the Northwestern edge of the Sacramento Valley, one of the five reservations in California legislated by the United States Government in 1852. The system of Indian reservations freed Indian land for the settlers' use, and cleared natives from the land by force.

When the reservation was established, the Yuki people (as they came to be called) of Round Valley were forced into a difficult and unusual situation. Their traditional homeland was not completely taken over by settlers as in other parts of California. Instead, a small part of it was reserved especially for their use as well as the use of other Indians, many of whom were enemies of the Yuki. The Yuki had to share their home with strangers who spoke other languages, lived with other beliefs, and who used the land and its products differently.

Indians came to Round Valley as they did to other reservations - by force. The word "drive", widely used at the time, is descriptive of the practice of "rounding up" Indians and "driving" them like cattle to the reservation where they were "corralled" by high picket fences. Such drives took place in all weather and seasons, and the elderly and sick often did not survive.

From years of intermarriage, a common lifestyle, and a shared land base, a unified community emerged. The descendants of Yuki, Concow Maidu, Little Lake and other Pomo, Nomlaki, Cahto, Wailaki, Pit River peoples formed a new tribe on the reservation, the Covelo Indian Community, later to be called the Round Valley Indian Tribes. Their heritage is a rich combination of different cultures with a common reservation experience and history.

Massacres and Fort Wright

Between July, 1856, when Superintendent of Indian Affairs, Thomas J. Henley, requested official designation of the valley as Nome Cult farm, and the granting of his request in 1858, Round Valley slowly filled with farms and ranches despite its reservation status. 

Relations between the various Indian groups, settlers and White employees of the reservation reached a state of extreme hostility. As part of the California genocide, bloodshed became a frequent occurrence as settlers massacred native Americans, some at the behest of future first Chief Justice of the California Supreme Court Serranus Clinton Hastings between the years 1850–70. They killed at least 283 men, women and children, the most deadly of 24 known state militia campaigns. The perpetrators of these massacres were paid or reimbursed for expenses by the State of California.

Superintendent Henley requested that the United States Army be sent to the valley to mediate.

Late in 1858, a company of the U. S. Army departed Benicia for Mendocino County.  Due to inclement weather, the march was forced to halt at Fort Weller in Redwood Valley, but Lieutenant Edward Dillon was sent ahead with a party of seventeen men to occupy the barracks in Round Valley.  Fort Wright was then established in December 1862, on the western edge of the Valley.

Originally the soldiers were to protect the Indians from White attacks but soon, as part of the Bald Hills War, were deployed to capture Indians throughout the area and bring them to confinement on the Reservation.

Federal legislation 

President Ulysses S. Grant formally established the Round Valley Indian Reservation by Executive Order on March 30, 1870, pursuant to the Four Reservations Act of 1864. Life on the Round Valley Reservation has since been affected by much government legislation.  Two of the most significant impacts were from the Dawes Act of 1887, also known as the Allotment Act, and the Indian Reorganization Act of 1934, known as the IRA.

The Allotment Act caused the Reservation to be subdivided in 1894 into five and  plots which were distributed to families.  By assigning specific pieces of land to individuals, the Act opened the door to private land ownership for Indians.  Although the land was allotted, it was still held in trust by the government.  However, in 1920, allotees were allowed to "fee patent" their land: to receive a deed to it by giving up its trust status and accompanying benefits, such as freedom from taxation.  Some Round Valley People lost their land as a result. Either they were unable to pay the new taxes on it or they sold it to whites or other Indians for the cash.  Others prospered by establishing farming and stock-raising operations. They leased extra land and raised garden vegetables, hay, hogs, and cattle.

In 1934, the United States Congress passed the Indian Reorganization Act.  In the interests of promoting self-government, only those Indian organizations consisting of elected councils, rather than those based on cultural traditions, were recognized as tribes by the Federal Bureau of Indian Affairs.  The Indians of Round Valley jointly elected a tribal council and wrote a constitution both of which still function.  Along with this alteration in tribal management, a whole range of new regulations intended to halt the loss of land from the Indian Community was also instituted.  The IRA repealed the Allotment Act and Indians on the Reservation were deprived of the legal ability to buy and sell land, hold deeds and to take out loans.  The land was put back into trust status and trust land could not be used as security.

When first recognized, the tribe and reservation were both known as the Covelo Indian Community.

Other Pomo communities in Mendocino County:
 Coyote Valley Reservation
 Redwood Valley Rancheria

See also 
 Mendocino Indian Reservation
 Nome Lackee Reservation
 Sebastian Indian Reservation
 Smith River Reservation
 Tule River Farm
 Fresno Indian Farm
 Kings River Indian Farm
 Klamath River Reservation

Notes

References 
 Maidu.com: Round Valley Indian Reservation History
 Round Valley Reservation and Off-Reservation Trust Land, California United States Census Bureau
 Economic Development Administration. U.S. Dept of Commerce. California Report: Round Valley Rancheria (p. 287-288) .  File retrieved May 5, 2007.

External links

 

Native American tribes in Mendocino County, California
Federally recognized tribes in the United States
Native American tribes in California
Maidu
Pomo tribe
Wintun
Populated places in Mendocino County, California
1856 establishments in California
Trinity County, California
California genocide